The Saturn L series is a line of automobiles, sedans and station wagons that were made by Saturn Corporation in Wilmington, Delaware.

Poor sales of the L-series cars caused GM to cancel the line for 2005. The first L-series car was built in May 1999, and the last one rolled off the Wilmington line on June 17, 2004, after a short run of 2005 models. About 406,300 L-series cars were built in this period. The plant was then retooled to build the Pontiac Solstice and Saturn Sky roadsters.

The replacement for the L series, the Saturn Aura, arrived in August 2006 for the 2007 model-year. The Aura was built on the Epsilon platform, also shared by the Pontiac G6, and the Chevrolet Malibu.

Model history
2000: In May 1999 for the 2000 model year, Saturn Corporation introduced the Saturn L series as a lineup of sedan and station wagon vehicle models – three sedan models and two station wagon models. The sedan L-series models were the LS, the LS1, and the LS2, and the station wagons were the LW1 and the LW2.
2001: For the 2001 model year, all of the L-series sedan and station wagon models were renamed for 2001. For the sedans, the LS was renamed as the L100, the LS1 was renamed as the L200, and the LS2 was renamed as the L300. For the station wagons, the LW1 was renamed as the LW200, and the LW2 was renamed as the LW300. Optional side curtain airbags were made available for the sedan models only.
2002: Side curtain airbags were made available as standard equipment for the 2002 model year for the sedan models only. The Saturn L100 was discontinued after the 2002 model year.

2003: Sedans were facelifted, front and rear; wagons received the new front along with new taillights. Silver dash trim replaced wood trim, and a new available alloy wheel design (borrowed from Saab) were also both added for the 2003 model year. Anti-lock brakes with traction control were made optional again.
2004: For the 2004 model year, the LW200 and the LW300 station wagons were both renamed as the Saturn L300 station wagon so that it would match the Saturn L300 sedan. The L series had also adopted a type of a trim level structure that was similar to the trim level structure on the Saturn ION. The L300 sedan and the L300 station wagon models both used the L300.1, the L300.2, and the L300.3 for both the L300 sedan and the L300 station wagon models. The Saturn L300 station wagon was discontinued after the 2004 model year.
2005: For the 2005 model year, the Saturn L series was now trimmed down to only one model: the L300.2 sedan. The last Saturn L-series model (the L300.2 sedan) rolled off the assembly line on June 17, 2004.

Quality issues
The L series was troubled early in production by a number of quality issues, often related to engine failures, transmission failures and overall fit and finish issues. Consumers reported repeat problems with tire noise and vibration linked to poorly designed control arm bushings and nonadjustable rear alignments. A retrofit kit was released to address these concerns.

In 2005, a recall was issued pursuant to a defect petition by the North Carolina Consumers Council, a consumer nonprofit advocacy organization, alleging repeat brake and tail light failures.  The resulting recall affected more than 300,000 vehicles in the United States and Canada.  Later that same year, the North Carolina Consumers Council petitioned for an investigation into timing chain failures and subsequent engine failures across the model lineup for vehicles using the 2.2L engine.  The resulting recall affected only a small number of vehicles built in a four-month period in late 2000 and early 2001.  The organization reported that complaints of engine failure due to a defective timing chain design persist to this day and requests for recall expansions have largely been ignored.  The organization has gone so far as to make its first recommendation against the purchase of a vehicle in its more than forty-year history due in part to this timing chain defect.

Safety

Insurance Institute for Highway Safety (IIHS)

NHTSA

References

External links

L series
Front-wheel-drive vehicles
Mid-size cars
Sedans
Station wagons
Cars introduced in 2000
Motor vehicles manufactured in the United States